Suding is a surname of:

 Katja Suding (born 1975), German politician (FDP)
 Katharine N. Suding, American plant ecologist
 Lorenzo Suding (born 1986), German-Italian professional mountain biker 
 Paul Hugo Suding (born 1949), German energy economist and international development specialist,